Ugadi is a 2007 Indian Kannada-language romantic drama film directed by Om Sai Prakash and produced by Mega Hit Productions. The film stars V. Ravichandran, Telugu actor Srikanth, Kamna Jethmalani and Jennifer Kotwal. The film is a remake of the successful Telugu film Santosham (2002) directed by Dasaradh and starred Nagarjuna and Prabhudeva.

The film released on 6 July 2007 to average response where the critics called it as an "ordinary" remake and "the only redeeming factor of this film is the last 20 minutes of the film". Nowrunning.com reviewed the film as "just another remake which does not raise above the ordinary levels and certainly does not reach the standards of its original film". Ironically, the film which itself was a remake from Telugu, was later dubbed again in Telugu language and released as America Alludu (2011).

Cast
 V. Ravichandran as Sanjay
 Kamna Jethmalani as Kaveri
 Jennifer Kotwal as Priya
 Srikanth as Arjun
 Srinivasa Murthy
 Vinaya Prasad
 Ramakrishna
 Rangayana Raghu
 Vijay Kashi
 Bullet Prakash
 Sadhu Kokila
 Sathyajith
 Chitra Shenoy

Soundtrack
The music of the film was composed by R. P. Patnaik and lyrics written by K. Kalyan except for one song. The composer chose the same tunes from the original Telugu version which he had composed in 2002.

References

External source

 Sify reviews Ugadi
 Indiaglitz reviews Ugadi

2007 films
2000s Kannada-language films
Indian romance films
Kannada remakes of Telugu films
Films directed by Sai Prakash
2000s romance films

kn:ಯುಗಾದಿ